The Georgetown Institute for Women, Peace and Security is an academic institute   that is housed in the Edmund A. Walsh School of Foreign Service at Georgetown University.  It was organized by the late Carol J. Lancaster, former Dean of Georgetown's School of Foreign Service, and was first announced in December 2011 by Georgetown University President John J. DeGioia and then-U.S. Secretary of State Hillary Clinton.  It began operations in February 2013.  The institute "examines and highlights the roles and experiences of women in peace and security worldwide through cutting edge research, global convenings and strategic partnerships."  The Institute's Executive Director is Melanne Verveer, former United States Ambassador-at-Large for Global Women's Issues and former chief of staff for Hillary Clinton when she was First Lady of the United States.  Clinton serves as the Institute's honorary chair.

References

External links
 Official website

Georgetown University programs
Educational institutions established in 2013
2013 establishments in Washington, D.C.